Giulia Mignemi (born 5 November 1999) is an Italian lightweight rower who won back-to-back world championships in the women's lightweight quad scull at the 2019 World Rowing Championships and 2022 World Rowing Championships.

References

External links

1999 births
Living people
Italian female rowers
World Rowing Championships medalists for Italy
20th-century Italian women
21st-century Italian women